Daniela Neunast (born 19 September 1966) is a retired German coxswain. She competed in the eights at the 1988, 1992 and 1996 Summer Olympics and finished in first, third and eighth place, respectively. She also won one gold, two silver and one bronze medal at the world championships of 1985–1989.

References

External links
 
 
 

1966 births
Living people
East German female rowers
German female rowers
Medalists at the 1992 Summer Olympics
Medalists at the 1988 Summer Olympics
Olympic gold medalists for East Germany
Olympic bronze medalists for Germany
Olympic rowers of Germany
Rowers at the 1988 Summer Olympics
Rowers at the 1992 Summer Olympics
Rowers at the 1996 Summer Olympics
Olympic medalists in rowing
World Rowing Championships medalists for East Germany
World Rowing Championships medalists for Germany
Sportspeople from Potsdam